Jacqueline Margaret Kay,  (born 9 November 1961), is a Scottish poet, playwright, and novelist, known for her works Other Lovers (1993), Trumpet (1998) and Red Dust Road (2011). Kay has won many awards, including the Guardian Fiction Prize in 1998 and the Scottish Mortgage Investment Trust Book of the Year Award in 2011.

From 2016 to 2021 Jackie Kay was the Makar, the poet laureate of Scotland. She was Chancellor of the University of Salford between 2015 and 2022.

Early life and education
Jackie Kay was born in Edinburgh, Scotland, in 1961, to a Scottish mother and a Nigerian father. She was adopted as a baby by a white Scottish couple, Helen and John Kay, and grew up in Bishopbriggs, a suburb of Glasgow. They adopted Jackie in 1961, having already adopted her brother, Maxwell, about two years earlier. Jackie and Maxwell also have siblings who were brought up by their biological parents.

Her adoptive father worked for the Communist Party full-time and stood for Member of Parliament, and her adoptive mother was the Scottish secretary of Campaign for Nuclear Disarmament. As a child Kay suffered racism from children and teachers at school. John Kay died in 2019 at the age of 94.

As a teenager she worked as a cleaner, working for David Cornwell—who wrote under the pen-name John le Carré—for four months. She recommended cleaning work to aspiring writers, saying: "It's great ... You're listening to everything. You can be a spy, but nobody thinks you're taking anything in." Cornwell and Kay met again in 2019; he remembered her, and had been following her.

In August 2007, Kay was the subject of the fourth episode of the BBC Radio 4 series The House I Grew Up In, in which she talked about her childhood.

Career
Initially harbouring ambitions to be an actor, she decided to concentrate on writing after Alasdair Gray, a Scottish artist and writer, read her poetry and told her that writing was what she should be doing. She studied English at the University of Stirling and her first book of poetry, the partially autobiographical, The Adoption Papers, was published in 1991 and won the Saltire Society Scottish First Book Award and a Scottish Arts Council Book Award in 1992. It is a multiply voiced collection of poetry that deals with identity, race, nationality, gender, and sexuality from the perspectives of three women: an adopted biracial child, her adoptive mother, and her biological mother. Her other awards include the 1994 Somerset Maugham Award for Other Lovers, and the Guardian Fiction Prize for Trumpet, inspired by the life of American jazz musician Billy Tipton, a transgender man.

In 1997, Kay published a biography of blues singer Bessie Smith; it was reissued in 2021. An abridged version read by the author featured as BBC Radio 4's Book of the Week in the last week of February 2021.

Kay writes extensively for stage (in 1988 her play Twice Over was the first by a Black writer to be produced by Gay Sweatshop Theatre Group), screen and for children. Her drama The Lamplighter is an exploration of the Atlantic slave trade. It was broadcast on BBC Radio 3 in March 2007, produced by Pam Fraser Solomon, during a season marking the bicentenary of the Slave Trade Act 1807, and was published in printed form as a poem in 2008.

In 2010 Kay published Red Dust Road, an account of her search for her biological parents, who had met each other when her father was a student at Aberdeen University and her mother was a nurse. The book was adapted for the stage by Tanika Gupta and premiered in August 2019 at the Edinburgh International Festival in a production by National Theatre of Scotland and HOME, at the Royal Lyceum Theatre in Edinburgh.

She is currently Professor of Creative Writing at Newcastle University, and Cultural Fellow at Glasgow Caledonian University. Kay lives in Manchester. She took part in the Bush Theatre's 2011 project Sixty-Six Books, her piece being based on the book of Esther from the King James Bible. In October 2014, it was announced that she had been appointed as the Chancellor of the University of Salford, and that she would be the university's "Writer in Residence" from 1 January 2015.

In March 2016, Kay was announced as the next Scots Makar (national poet of Scotland), succeeding Liz Lochhead, whose tenure ended in January 2016.

She was appointed Member of the Order of the British Empire (MBE) in the 2006 Birthday Honours for services to literature, and Commander of the Order of the British Empire (CBE) in the 2020 New Year Honours, again for services to literature. Kay was on the list of the BBC's 100 Women announced on 23 November 2020.

Personal life
Kay is a lesbian. In her twenties she gave birth to a son, Matthew (whose father is the writer Fred D'Aguiar), and later she had a 15-year relationship with poet Carol Ann Duffy. During this relationship, Duffy had a daughter, Ella, whose biological father is fellow poet Peter Benson.

Awards and honours

1991: Eric Gregory Award
1992: Scottish First Book of the Year, The Adoption Papers
1994: Somerset Maugham Award, Other Lovers
1998: Guardian Fiction Prize, Trumpet
2000: International Dublin Literary Award (shortlist), Trumpet
2003: Cholmondeley Award
2006: MBE, Services to Literature 
2007: British Book Awards deciBel Writer of the Year
2009: Scottish Book of the Year (shortlist), The Lamplighter
2011: Scottish Book of the Year (shortlist), Fiere
2011: Costa Book Awards (shortlist), Fiere
2011: PEN/Ackerley Prize (shortlist), Red Dust Road
2011: Scottish Mortgage Investment Trust Book of the Year Award, Red Dust Road
2016: Elected a Fellow of the Royal Society of Edinburgh
2016: The Scots Makar
2020: CBE, Services to Literature

Selected works
 The Adoption Papers, Bloodaxe Books, 1991,  (poetry)
 Other Lovers, Bloodaxe Books, 1993,  (poetry)
 Off Colour, Bloodaxe Books, 1998,  (poetry)
 Trumpet (fiction – 1998); Random House Digital, Inc., 2011, 
 The Frog who dreamed she was an Opera Singer, Bloomsbury Children's Books, 1998, 
 Two's Company, Puffin Books, 1994, 
 Bessie Smith (biography – 1997), Faber & Faber, 2021, 
 Why Don't You Stop Talking (fiction – 2002); Pan Macmillan, 2012, 
 Strawgirl, Macmillan Children's, 2002, 
 Life Mask, Bloodaxe Books, 2005,  (poetry)
 Wish I Was Here (fiction – 2006); Pan Macmillan, 2012, 
 Darling: New & Selected Poems, Bloodaxe Books, 2007,  (poetry)
 The Lamplighter, Bloodaxe Books, 2008,  (poetry/radio play)
 Red Cherry Red, Bloomsbury Publishing Plc, 2007, 
 Maw Broon Monologues (2009) (shortlisted for the Ted Hughes Award for New Work in Poetry)
  (memoir)
 Fiere, Pan Macmillan, 2011,  (poetry)
 Reality, Reality, Pan Macmillan, 2012, 
 The Empathetic Store, Mariscat Press, 2015,  (poetry)
 Bantam, Pan Macmillan, 2017, 

Some other poetry used in GCSE Edexcel Syllabus
 Brendon Gallacher
 Lucozade
 Yellow

See also

Twice Through the Heart – opera with libretto by Kay.

References

External links

Transcript of interview with Ramona Koval, The Book Show, ABC Radio National, 4 September 2008, recorded at Edinburgh International Book Festival, 2008
Poetry Archive: Jackie Kay
Biography, bibliography, prizes and awards, critical review and related links
Streamed poetry read by Jackie Kay
Bibliography, prizes and awards
Guardian article (01/2002)
Books From Scotland interview (12/2005)
Free Verse interview (2002/01)
Bold Type interview
Audio interview with Canadian Broadcasting Corporation, 2006.
Bessie Smith by Jackie Kay; BBC Sounds

Living people
1961 births
20th-century Scottish dramatists and playwrights
20th-century Scottish novelists
20th-century Scottish poets
20th-century Scottish women writers
21st-century Scottish dramatists and playwrights
21st-century Scottish novelists
21st-century Scottish poets
21st-century Scottish women writers
21st-century Scottish writers
Fellows of the Royal Society of Literature
Academics of Newcastle University
Alumni of the University of Stirling
BBC 100 Women
Black British women academics
Black British women writers
Chancellors of the University of Salford
Commanders of the Order of the British Empire
Lambda Literary Award winners
LGBT Black British people
Scottish LGBT writers
Nigerian adoptees
People from Bishopbriggs
Scots Makars
Scottish adoptees
Scottish people of Nigerian descent
Scottish women dramatists and playwrights
Scottish women novelists
Scottish women poets
Writers from Glasgow
Writers from Edinburgh
Scottish lesbian writers